Greg Lobban (born 12 August 1992 in Inverness) is a professional squash player who represented Scotland. He reached a career-high world ranking of World No. 27 in February 2019. He joined the Professional Squash Association in 2012. He is one of Scotland's best current players on the PSA World Tour.

Tournament History 
He first showed his mettle at the 2012 IMET Open, claiming the title after being seeded eighth for the tournament.
Lobban broke the world's top 100 in March 2013 and his fifth PSA World Tour title came at the Steel City Open, beating George Parker in the final.

It was in his home-country of Scotland that Lobban lifted his first PSA M10 crown when he beat Joel Hinds in the final in April 2015.

He went on to reach the final of the Victorian Open three months later before losing to Ryan Cuskelly and he followed that up with a quarter-final finish at the Kolkata International which enabled him to reach the world’s top 40 for the first time.

2016 brought a number of early-round exits for Lobban which helped him consolidate his place in the world’s top 40 in the World Rankings for the majority of 2016. Lobban then reached the final of both the Chicago Open and Arnold Homes Tring Open in 2017, losing out narrowly to Campbell Grayson and England’s Declan James. Lobban was sidelined for seven months of the season after he suffered a hamstring tear during his final clash with Grayson. However, the Scotsman soon rediscovered his form when he returned to the squash court in May, reaching six finals and claiming three titles – including wins at the Vitesse Stortford Classic, the NZ International Classic and the Invercargill Open.

PSA World Tour Titles 
 2012 Imet Open M5, Slovakia
 2013 SRAM Series No.2 M5, Malaysia
 2014 Geneva Open M5, Switzerland
 2014 Securian Open M5, USA
 2014 Steel City Open M5, England
 2015 North of Scotland Open M10, Scotland
 2017 Vitesse Stortford Classic M10, England
 2017 New Zealand International Classic M10, Palmerston North
 2017 ILT-Community Trust NZ Southern Invercargill Open M15, New Zealand

References

External links 
 
 
 

1992 births
Living people
Scottish male squash players
Squash players at the 2014 Commonwealth Games
Squash players at the 2018 Commonwealth Games
Commonwealth Games competitors for Scotland